Art Nouveau in Poland was part of an international Art Nouveau style, although often absorbed into a local Polish architectural and artistic trends. It was most popular in the years 1890–1910.

Artists adopted many of the floral and organic motifs of Art Nouveau into the Young Poland style. Young Poland, however, was also inclusive of other artistic styles and encompassed a broader approach to art, literature, and lifestyle.

The Polish Art Nouveau style was centred in Kraków, once Poland's royal capital city. Stanisław Wyspiański was the chief Art Nouveau artist in Poland; his paintings, theatrical designs, stained glass windows and building interiors are widely admired and celebrated in the National Museum in Kraków. The Zakopane Style architecture is part of Polish Art Nouveau style. Also, Vienna Secession buildings can be found in various Polish cities, e.g. in Bielsko-Biała (Saint Nicholas' Cathedral and house at 51 Stojałowskiego Street by Leopold Bauer as well as house at 1 Barlickiego Street by Max Fabiani).

Main centers of Art Nouveau buildings in Poland are Kraków, Łódź, Wrocław, Poznań and Bydgoszcz. Warsaw was once a thriving centre of Art Nouveau architecture, however, only a few individual buildings survive; the city was razed during World War II. Subsequently, more destruction was inflicted by the communist authorities between 1947 and 1989 on the grounds that the buildings were perceived as decadent and bourgeois.

Notable Polish Art Nouveau architects include Franciszek Mączyński, Tadeusz Stryjeński, Ludwik Wojtyczko, Sławomir Odrzywolski, Beniamin Torbe, Romuald Miller, Wiktor Miarczyński.

Gallery

References

 
Architecture in Poland